Shackleton Ice Shelf is an extensive ice shelf fronting the coast of East Antarctica from 95° E to 105° E. It extends for an along-shore distance of about , projecting seaward about  in the western portion and  in the east. It is part of Mawson Sea and separates the Queen Mary Coast to the west from the Knox Coast of Wilkes Land to the east.

Discovery and naming
The existence of this ice shelf was first made known by the USEE under Charles Wilkes who mapped a portion of it from the Vincennes in February 1840. It was explored by the Australian Antarctic Expedition under Douglas Mawson (1911–14) who named it for Sir Ernest Shackleton. The extent of the ice shelf was mapped in greater detail in 1955, using aerial photography obtained by US Navy Operation Highjump, 1946–47. Further mapping by the Soviet Expedition of 1956 showed the portion eastward of Scott Glacier to be a part of this ice shelf.

Important Bird Area
A 500 ha site on the ice shelf has been designated an Important Bird Area (IBA) by BirdLife International because it supports a breeding colony of some 6,500 emperor penguins, based on 2009 satellite imagery.

See also
 List of glaciers
 List of Antarctic ice shelves
 Chugunov Island

References

External links
 

Important Bird Areas of Antarctica
Penguin colonies
Ice shelves of Antarctica
Bodies of ice of Queen Mary Land
Bodies of ice of Wilkes Land